Le Bonheur is the eighth album by experimental French singer Brigitte Fontaine and the sixth by Areski Belkacem, released in 1975 on the Saravah label. It is their fourth collaborative album.

The album features some abstracts from plays and noises (like animal cries). The booklet claims that the album was recorded "during Winter 1975 in a theater, a kitchen, a barn and a studio."

Track listing

Personnel

Musicians
 Areski Belkacem: guitar, percussions, flute, vocals
 Brigitte Fontaine: vocals, toys, theater drum
 Djamel: percussions
 Les Amis de la Bête: background vocals (track 11)

Production
 Recording: Jean-Pierre Chambard
 Production: Pierre Barouh
 Photographs: Ned Burgess

1975 albums
Brigitte Fontaine albums
Areski Belkacem albums